This supranational electoral calendar for the year 2012 lists the supranational elections held in 2012. All the elections are non-popularly elected.

April 
 16: World Bank president

June
 8: UNGA president

July
 15: African Union Chairperson

October
 UNSC

November
 Human Rights Council

References

2012 elections
Supranational elections